The Zhongzhu Harbor is a port in Lehua Village, Dongyin Township, Lienchiang County, Taiwan. It is the main port for people to get in and out from Dongyin Island.

History
The harbor was constructed by the Republic of China Armed Forces. They used rock blasted out to build a levee at the northern part of the harbor, connecting Dongyin Island and Xiyin Island.

Architecture
Next to the harbor is the giant Chinese characters pictures showing that people are at Lehua Village.

Destinations
Boats departing from this harbor departs to Fu'ao Harbor in Nan'gan Township.

See also
 Transportation in Taiwan

References

Buildings and structures in Lienchiang County
Dongyin Township
Ports and harbors of Taiwan
Transportation in Lienchiang County